Vincenzo Cuoco (October 1, 1770 – December 14, 1823) was an Italian writer. He is mainly remembered for his Saggio Storico sulla Rivoluzione Napoletana del 1799 ("Historical Essay on the Neapolitan Revolution of 1799"). He is a considered one of the precursors of Italian liberalism and the realist school. Cuoco adapted the critique of political rationalism of Edmund Burke and Joseph de Maistre for liberal ends, and has been described as a better historian than either of them. He influenced many subsequent Italian intellectuals, from Ugo Foscolo and Alessandro Manzoni to Bertrando and Silvio Spaventa to Benedetto Croce and Antonio Gramsci.

Biography

Early life
Vincenzo Cuoco was born into a middle class family in the town of Civitacampomarano, near Campobasso in the Molise region of central Italy. His father was Michelangelo Cuoco, a lawyer and economist, while his mother was Colomba de Marinis. He studied in his native town under Francesco Maria Pepe, then moved to Naples in 1787 to study jurisprudence and become a lawyer, but instead found himself attracted to economics, philosophy, history, and politics. In Naples he had the opportunity to meet some of the prominent intellectuals of Southern Italy, including Giuseppe Maria Galanti, who in a letter to Vincenzo's father described the young man as capace, di molta abilità e di molto talento ("able, of great skill and great talent"), although trascurato ("careless") and indolente ("lazy"); Galanti was probably not entirely satisfied with Vincenzo's collaboration on his Descrizione Geografica e Politica delle Sicilie. During his studies, Cuoco was deeply influenced by Enlightenment writers from Southern Italy (Genovesi, Galiani, and of course Galanti) and France (Montesquieu, Rousseau), as well as by earlier writers, especially Giambattista Vico and Niccolò Machiavelli.

Revolution and exile
When the Neapolitan revolution broke out in January 1799, Vincenzo Cuoco strongly supported the new Republican government installed in place of the monarchy of Ferdinand I of the Two Sicilies; he became secretary to Ignazio Gonfalonieri and was tasked with the organisation of the Volturno Department. Following the reinstatement of the monarchy in June 1799, Cuoco was imprisoned for a few months, his belongings confiscated, and was then forced into exile. He took refuge first in Paris, then in Milan, where he published his main work ("Saggio Storico sulla Rivoluzione Napoletana del 1799").

He accepted positions in the Repubblica Cisalpina and the Repubblica Italiana, most notably the job of executive editor of the "Giornale Italiano" magazine during the period 1804–1806. His articles in the Giornale spurred Italians towards change in ethics, society, politics, and the economy, in order to make themselves worthy of national independence. During this period, he also wrote his epistolary novel "Platone in Italia", published in 1806).

Back to Naples
In 1806 Vincenzo Cuoco returned to Naples, as Ferdinand I of the Two Sicilies had been deposed in favour of Giuseppe Bonaparte (Napoleon's elder brother). He was given significant responsibilities in the public administration, first as Consigliere di Cassazione (councilor to the Supreme Court), then as Direttore del Tesoro (director of the Treasury); he distinguished himself as one of the most important councilors of the government of Joachim Murat. He wrote for the magazine Monitore delle Due Sicilie ("Monitor of the Two Sicilies"), and founded the Giornale Costituzionale delle Due Sicilie ("Constitutional Journal of the Two Sicilies"). In 1809, Cuoco also drafted a Progetto per l'Ordinamento della Pubblica Istruzione nel Regno di Napoli" ("Project for the Ordainment of Public Education in the Kingdom of Naples"), in which he expounded his view of public education as an indispensable tool towards the formation of a common national awareness in the people. In 1808 he was the president of the Accademia Pontaniana.

In 1810 he was named Chief of the Provincial Council of Molise and, in 1812, wrote the Viaggio in Molise ("Journey Through Molise") about his native region. In 1815, after Ferdinand I was restored to the throne following the Battle of Tolentino, Cuoco retired from politics.

Illness and death
After his retirement, Cuoco started to show worrying signs of mental instability. He reportedly destroyed some of his writings, had frequent breakdowns, and became increasingly apathetic and withdrawn from social life. There are no clues as to the exact cause of these symptoms; but whatever the disease was, he died of it in Naples in 1823.

Works
 Lettere a Vincenzo Russo ("Letters to Vincenzo Russo") - Written during the 1799 Neapolitan Republic, the letters comment on the Constitution that was being written for the nascent Republic and champion devolution.
 Saggio Storico sulla Rivoluzione Napoletana del 1799 ("Historical Essay on the Neapolitan Revolution of 1799") - Published in 1801 in Milan, where Cuoco was exiled, is a passionate critique of the short-lived republican Revolution, which Cuoco identified as doomed to failure (because it was carried out by an elite of revolutionaries detached from the common people), yet praiseworthy (because it tried to free the people and was paid for with the heroic sacrifice of the revolutionaries' lives once the monarchy was restored). Cuoco wrote a second edition which was published in 1806 and remains the standard account to this day.
 Platone in Italia ("Plato in Italy") - Published in 1806 in Milan, this is an epistolary novel in which Cuoco imagines an ancient civilisation that flourished in Southern Italy before the Greek colonisation and yearns for a spiritual rebirth of Italy stemming from its own traditions, and not from foreign influences. This theme would be reprised continually throughout the Risorgimento, most notably by Vincenzo Gioberti.

References
 A. Boroli et al., Universo - la grande enciclopedia per tutti, Istituto Geografico De Agostini S.p.A., Novara, 1970;
 Various, Enciclopedia, UTET Torino - Istituto Geografico De Agostini S.p.A., Novara - Gruppo Editoriale L'Espresso S.p.A., Roma, 2003;
 Mario Pazzaglia, Letteratura Italiana vol. 3, third edition, Zanichelli, Bologna, 1992.
 Massimo Colella, Luigi Russo interprete di Vincenzo Cuoco. Un inedito corso universitario, in «Otto/Novecento», 2020, pp. 153-187.

Notes

Further reading

External links

 Scrittori d'Italia is an authorised digital reproduction of some old editions the works of Vincenzo Cuoco published by Laterza (publisher). This includes Platone in Italia (1916 edition of volume I, 1924 edition of volume II), Saggio Storico sulla Rivoluzione Napoletana del 1799 (1913 edition), and Scritti Vari. (1924 edition of volume I, written while in Milan, and 1924 edition of volume II, written while in Naples).

1770 births
1823 deaths
People from the Province of Campobasso
Italian essayists
Italian male non-fiction writers
19th-century Italian historians
Italian economists
Male essayists
Italian Freemasons
People of the Parthenopean Republic